G 99-47 (V1201 Orionis) is a nearby degenerate star (white dwarf) of spectral class DAP8 (DAP8.9, or DAP8.7), the single known component of the system, located in the constellation Orion. G 99-47 is probably the tenth closest white dwarf, followed by Gliese 293, Gliese 518 and Gliese 915.

The mass of G 99-47 is  Solar masses; its surface gravity is 108.20 ± 0.05 (1.58 · 108) cm·s−2, or approximately 162 000 of Earth's, corresponding to a radius 7711 km, or 121% of Earth's. Its temperature is 5790 ± 110 K, almost like the Sun's; its cooling age, i. e. age as degenerate star (not including lifetime as main sequence star and as giant star) is 3.97 Gyr. Due almost equal to the Sun's temperature, GJ 1087 should appear almost the same white color as the Sun. The white dwarf has a strong magnetic field, with measured vertical component near surface equal to 560 T.

See also
 List of star systems within 25–30 light-years

Notes

References

White dwarfs
Orion (constellation)
1087
Orionis, V1201
J05562547+0521486
TIC objects